Florian Volpe (born 19 May 1990) is a French former footballer.

He played for Chilean second-tier side Magallanes, being the first French footballer to play in the history of Chilean professional football.

External links
 
 

1990 births
Living people
French footballers
French expatriate footballers
FC Sète 34 players
Silvio Pettirossi footballers
Club Atlético 3 de Febrero players
Magallanes footballers
Primera B de Chile players
Expatriate footballers in Chile
French expatriate sportspeople in Chile
Association football midfielders